Triviola is a genus of moths in the family Lecithoceridae. It contains the sole species Triviola puiensis, which is found in Thailand.

Description

References

Torodorinae
Monotypic moth genera
Moths of Asia
Endemic fauna of Thailand